The 2012 FIA WTCC Race of Brazil was the eighth round of the 2012 World Touring Car Championship season and the seventh running of the FIA WTCC Race of Brazil. It was held on 22 July 2012 at the Autódromo Internacional de Curitiba in Pinhais, Brazil. Both races were won by Chevrolet with Yvan Muller winning race one and Robert Huff winning race two.

Background
In the break prior to the event, Chevrolet announced they were pulling out of the World Touring Car Championship at the end of the season. This would leave Muller, Huff and Alain Menu without drives for the 2013 season. It was Yvan Muller who was leading the championship coming into Brazil on 245 points ahead of Huff and Menu. Pepe Oriola was leading the Yokohama Independents' Trophy.

In the weeks prior to Brazil, Honda also announced their 2013 driver lineup. Gabriele Tarquini and Tiago Monteiro would join the works team for the following season, with Monteiro also driving for them in the final three events of the 2012 season.

Pasquale di Sabatino, recovering from bronchitis and pneumonia was ruled out of competing by doctors. Michel Nykjær substituted for the Italian driver at bamboo-engineering for the weekend.

Report

Free Practice
Muller led a Chevrolet 1–2–3 in free practice one with Tarquini in fourth ahead of the bamboo-engineering Chevrolet duo of Michel Nykjær and Alex MacDowall.

Muller topped the times once again in the second free practice session ahead of both his Chevrolet teammates. Behind them it was the future Honda duo of Tarquini and Monteiro in front of the bamboo-engineering drivers.

Qualifying
After leading both free practice sessions, Muller took his third pole position of the season with Menu second and Huff third. Nykjær lined up fourth on his return to the WTCC with Tarquini the leading non-Chevrolet driver in fifth. Norbert Michelisz finished 10th in Q2 to take the reversed grid pole position for race two.

Warm-Up
Muller led a Chevrolet 1–2–3–4 in Sunday morning's warm-up session with Tarquini the fastest non-Chevrolet car.

Race One
The three Chevrolet cars led from the start and had an easy race with the exception of third placed Huff who had to defend from the SEAT of Tarquini. A coming together on the second lap forced both Monteiro and Alberto Cerqui into retirement. Tarquini finished fourth behind the works Chevrolet cars, led by Muller and ahead of the bamboo-engineering pair of Nykjær and MacDowall. Nykjær celebrated his return to the WTCC as the winning independent driver. Michelisz finished ahead of Oriola in the independents' race which would see him close in the Yokohama Trophy title lead. A last lap coming together between Stefano D'Aste and Franz Engstler for fifteenth landed D'Aste with a 30-second penalty after the race, dropping him to seventeenth.

Race Two
Michelisz started on pole position for the second race and he held the lead until half distance when he got passed by Tarquini, Huff, Menu and Muller on the same lap. Huff and Menu were then able to overtake the Italian driver and use him as a buffer between themselves and championship leader Muller. A coming together between ROAL Motorsport's Cerqui and Lukoil Racing Team's Aleksei Dudukalo forced the BMW to crash into the pit wall and retirement. At the flag Huff and Menu formed a Chevrolet 1–2 with Tarquini third and Muller missing out on a podium in fourth. Michelisz finished fifth as the winning independent as Oriola watched on from the pits having retired from the race, his Yokohama Trophy lead lost to the Zengő Motorsport driver.

Results

Qualifying

Bold denotes Pole position for second race.

Race 1

Bold denotes Fastest lap.

Race 2

Bold denotes Fastest lap.

Standings after the round

Drivers' Championship standings

Yokohama Independents' Trophy standings

Manufacturers' Championship standings

 Note: Only the top five positions are included for both sets of drivers' standings.

References

External links 

Brazil
FIA WTCC Race of Brazil
FIA WTCC Race of Brazil